Refuge du Théodule is a refuge in the Pennine Alps located at the Theodulpass between the Mattertal and Valtournanche in the Aosta Valley, Italy.

Mountain huts in the Alps
Mountain huts in Italy